The Hymn of a Broken Man is the debut album by American heavy metal band Times of Grace, released on January 18, 2011 through Roadrunner Records.

Background
When touring the UK with Killswitch Engage, guitarist Adam Dutkiewicz required emergency surgery on his back. While in the hospital recovering, he began writing new material which he later recorded and demoed at home. Dutkiewicz later contacted former Killswitch Engage bandmate and singer Jesse Leach about writing lyrics and recording vocals feeling that he "[doesn't] think [he is] the greatest vocalist and lyricist" and "wanted a little help in that department." Under the moniker Times of Grace, they began recording material in 2008 with Dutkiewicz stating on the group's Myspace that the songs were "an epic mix of Metal/Rock/Pop/Shoe gaze & Punk. All of your metal expectations will be incorrect, we are pushing genre boundaries". They hoped to release an album of finished material by the summer of 2009.

After completing the recording of material in 2009, Times of Grace returned in 2010 to release their debut album. Dutkiewicz recorded vocals, guitars, bass and drums for the album with Leach providing lead vocals and lyrics. In September, they filmed a video for the single "Strength in Numbers", with debut album The Hymn of a Broken Man scheduled for release on November 9. However, the album's release was delayed with a new release date of January 18, 2011.
The majority of songs on the album are played in Drop D tuning, although for the songs "Fight for Life", "Until the End of Days", "The End of Eternity" and "Fall From Grace" Adam uses a 7 string tuned to Drop A.

A limited CD/DVD edition was also released, featuring 13 companion videos made by Agata Alexander which present a visual interpretation of the album.

Reception

Critical
The Hymn of a Broken Man received generally positive reviews, scoring a 69 out of 100 on Metacritic based on seven reviews. Allmusic reviewer Phil Freeman commented that "Anyone who thought Times of Grace was going to represent some radical departure is bound to be disappointed. Anybody who comes to it expecting melodic metal with hardcore crunch, occasional bits of post-rock guitar, and angsty yet ultimately life-affirming lyrics, on the other hand, will be pleased." Rick Florino of Artistdirect gave the album a perfect score of five out of five, commenting that "The Hymn of a Broken Man functions as a heavy, heartfelt journey through pain," and that "Times Of Grace are the future. Let another new age begin."

Commercial
Upon release, The Hymn of a Broken Man charted at number 44 on the Billboard 200, selling nearly 10,000 copies. It also debuted at number 2 on the Hard Rock charts and number 13 on the Rock album chart overall as well.

Track listing

Charts

Personnel
Credits are adapted from the album's liner notes.

Times of Grace
 Adam Dutkiewicz – vocals, lead guitar, bass guitar, drums, rhythm guitar
 Jesse Leach – vocals

Additional musicians
 Rebekah Dutkiewicz – backing vocals 

Production and design
 Adam Dutkiewicz – production, engineering, mixing
 Jim Fogarty – engineering
 Ted Jensen – mastering
 Monte Conner – A&R
 Jesse Leach – art direction
 Dan Mandell – art direction, design, photography
 Gail Marowitz – art direction

References

2011 debut albums
Times of Grace albums
Roadrunner Records albums
Albums produced by Adam Dutkiewicz